Meray Dost Meray Yaar (English: My Beloved, My Friend) is a 2019 Pakistan web television series premiered on Geo Entertainment and YouTube on 26 October 2019. It is co-produced by GroupM ESP and LU Pakistan It has Asim Azhar, Syra Shehroz and Haroon Shahid in starring roles. The series is about college students and their love triangles. Its second season premiered on 18 October 2020 with a total of 7 episodes.

Cast

Season 1 
Asim Azhar as Zain
Haroon Shahid as Sherry
Syra Yousuf as Zoya
Hamza Tariq Jamil as Mohib
Mariam Mirza
Mehmood Aslam
Hassan Jahangir
Bilal Saeed
Sara Gilani
Shafqat Khan

Season 2 
Hania Aamir
Asim Azhar
Mariyam Nafees
Asad Siddiqui
Sabeena Syed
Hamza Tariq Jamil
Usama Khan

References 

2019 Pakistani television series debuts
Pakistani web series